The Jasin Hot Spring is a hot spring in Bemban, Jasin District, Melaka, Malaysia.

History
The hot spring was originally established by businessman Tan Kim Tean from Singapore on 8 May 1884 as a public bathing house.

Architecture
The hot spring compound covers an area of 1.2 hectares.

Opening time
The hot spring opens everyday except Monday from 9.00 a.m. to 12.00 a.m.

See also
 Geography of Malaysia

References

Hot springs of Malaysia
Jasin District
Tourist attractions in Malacca